"Swing Ya Rag" is a song by American hip hop recording artist T.I., released August 26, 2008 as the third single from his highly acclaimed sixth studio album Paper Trail (2008). The song features vocals and instrumental production from American music producer Swizz Beatz, who raps the chorus. T.I. performed the song at the 2008 BET Hip Hop Awards and at the 2009 New Year's Eve Special on NBC. The song is also featured in the 2009 video game expansion pack, Grand Theft Auto IV: The Lost and Damned.

Music video
On August 5, 2008, a behind the scenes video of the music video was released online. In the footage, T.I. is wearing black leather jacket and swinging a red rag in the air, while he wears a black rag around his face. The music video for the song was shot the day after T.I. shot the music video for "What Up, What's Haapnin'".

According to T.I. and MTV, the music video will never be released.

On December 15, MTV did another interview asking T.I. if he'll shoot a different video for the song, he responded saying

Track listing
Digital single

Remixes

Swing Ya Rag - Clipse Feat. Swizz Beatz
It's The New - Royce Da 5'9"

Charts

References

2008 singles
2008 songs
T.I. songs
Swizz Beatz songs
Grand Hustle Records singles
Song recordings produced by Swizz Beatz
Songs written by Swizz Beatz
Songs written by T.I.
Music video controversies